Doultabad, Doulatabad, or Daulatabad may refer to:

India
 Daulatabad Fort, Maharashtra
 Doulatabad, Mahbubnagar, Telangana
 Doultabad, Siddipet district, Telangana
 Daulatabad, Murshidabad, West Bengal
 Doultabad, Bishnupur, West Bengal
 Daultabad, Uttar Pradesh

Iran and Afghanistan
 Dowlatabad (disambiguation), a number of places